Kurzanov is a Russian masculine surname, its feminine counterpart is Kurzanova. Notable people with the surname include:

Sergei Kurzanov (born 1947), Russian paleontologist 

Russian-language surnames